The 1958 Nebraska Cornhuskers football team was the representative of the University of Nebraska and member of the Big 7 Conference in the 1958 NCAA University Division football season. The team was coached by Bill Jennings and played their home games at Memorial Stadium in Lincoln, Nebraska.

Before the season
Nebraska was reeling from the 1957 season that saw a new all-time low mark set when the Cornhuskers finished 1–9–0, which was the first 1-win season since 1899, and the first ever 9-loss season. Coach Jennings began the second year of his first head coaching job with few places to go but up, but led a young squad with only six seniors. The 1958 schedule was loaded with powerhouse teams from the east, every bit as difficult as the 1957 slate had been, so the task to succeed over last year would not be an easy one.

Schedule

Roster

Starters

Coaching staff

Game summaries

Penn State

A shocked home field crowd watched in utter amazement as the highly ranked Nittany Lions were picked apart by the Cornhuskers. The media overwhelmingly had predicted a smashing Penn State victory, but the Nebraska team came out on fire and held Penn State off the scoreboard until the 4th quarter. A 91-yard kickoff return by Cornhusker HB Pat Fischer made the difference in the game's final seven-point margin.  Nebraska still lagged behind the Nittany Lions 2–4 all time.

Purdue

In a complete turnaround of fortunes, the traveling Cornhuskers were overrun by a relentless Purdue attack and could not produce any offensive yardage of value. Two lost fumbles and an interception contributed to the lopsided loss as Nebraska was blanked under the weight of four Boilermaker touchdowns. This was the first meeting of these teams.

Iowa State

Iowa State's bid to take a second straight game from the Cornhuskers was denied as the final minutes ticked away. Down 0–6 after an earlier Cyclone touchdown and blocked point after, Nebraska finally punched in a touchdown of their own shortly before time expired. The Cornhusker kick after was good, sending the Cyclones home with their 42nd loss in the 52-game series.

Kansas State

Plagued by injuries, Nebraska was unsuccessful in attempts to slow the Kansas State offensive plan. The Cornhuskers narrowly avoided the shutout only by an interception returned for a touchdown. The Wildcats enjoyed their relatively rare victory, their 8th in 42 attempts, with the knowledge that it was also marked the 200th all-time program loss suffered by the Cornhuskers.

Syracuse

Following the loss to Kansas State and still not fully recovered from early season injuries, Nebraska traveled to Syracuse with third-stringers starting in some positions. The imbalance in experience showed as the Orangemen had little difficulty running away with the game in a 38–0 blanking of the Cornhuskers. The win moved Syracuse ahead in the series, to 5–4–0.

Colorado

The Cornhuskers were struggling to find some success on the field to show for their efforts, but faced a stiff road test when visiting #12 Colorado in Boulder. Against expectations, Nebraska blocked two punts and capitalized on three turnovers to lead the Buffaloes for the first three quarters, putting a good scare into the crowd. However, the Cornhuskers finally gave way in the final quarter and allowed Colorado to surge ahead and take the game. It was Nebraska's third straight loss to the Buffaloes as their series lead slipped to just 9–8–0.

Missouri

Nebraska suffered yet another demoralizing loss as the Tigers arrived in Lincoln and handed another shutout defeat to the Cornhuskers, their third of the season. The homecoming crowd was never a factor, as the Nebraska offense never seemed to find a spark. The best Nebraska performance of the day was the kicking game, made necessary for lack of first down production. Missouri narrowed the series to 20–28–3 and kept the Missouri-Nebraska Victory Bell in Columbia.

Kansas

The game was somewhat closer than the final score indicated, as Nebraska drew within five yards of a touchdown on two occasions before being turned away. The Jayhawks were not impressed by statistical victories and had little difficulty defeating the Cornhuskers by 22 points in Lawrence, though their series record was still far behind Nebraska at 15–46–3. It was Nebraska's fifth straight loss, which would've tied the program's all-time loss streak record had it not just been broken by the seven-game skid set in the previous year.

Pittsburgh

The downtrodden Cornhuskers, now 2–6 and watching their season slip away into disappointment, had every reason to just lay down in front of #14 Pittsburgh. For some reason, the Panthers held a commanding dominance over Nebraska year in and year out, owning the series at 15–3–3 heading into this game. Perhaps it was this circumstance that might have caused the Panthers to overlook the Cornhuskers, but once on the field it was the Pittsburgh players suddenly on their heels. The Cornhuskers played a stellar contest, holding the lead through the entire game and not allowing the Panthers to get their single touchdown until the fourth quarter on a long pass completion. Though dominated by their fellow conference opponents this year, the Cornhuskers were now 2–2 in nonconference play against major eastern teams, and the rare win against the rival Panthers was savored by all.

Oklahoma

If Pittsburgh allowed themselves to overlook and then get stunned by Nebraska, the #4 Sooners took note and ensured the same fate did not befall their team in the annual Nebraska-Oklahoma game. By the end of the first quarter, Oklahoma already had put in three touchdowns, and they never looked back. The Cornhuskers avoided the shutout only by returning an interception 89 yards to score. The loss to Oklahoma was the 16th straight allowed by Nebraska, and was Oklahoma's 71st consecutive conference win.  Oklahoma went on to finish #5 in the AP Poll and then defeated Syracuse 21–6 in the 1959 Orange Bowl.

After the season
It wasn't easy to determine if 1958 was a successful season or another failure. Coach Jennings had improved over last year's dismal 1–9–0 outing, but only to 3–7–0 and a 6th-place finish in the Big 7. On the other hand, surprise upset wins against Syracuse and especially against Pittsburgh were remarkable bright spots on an otherwise dreary year. These two unexpected wins may have played a part in Jennings being given additional time to see if he could turn the program around. Now with two years on the job, Coach Jennings had compiled a dismal 4–16–0 (.200) career record, with an even worse 2–10–0 (.167) history within the conference. Nebraska's overall program record slipped for the 8th straight year, to 355–205–34 (.626), with a Big 7 record now down to 148–68–12 (.689).

Future professional players
Pat Fischer, 1961 17th-round pick of the St. Louis Cardinals
Ron McDole, 1961 4th-round pick of the St. Louis Cardinals

References

Nebraska
Nebraska Cornhuskers football seasons
Nebraska Cornhuskers football